Thomas McKean (born 27 October 1963) is a British former middle-distance runner. He is a former world and European indoor 800 metres champion. Outdoors, McKean has medalled twice each at European and Commonwealth level.

Athletics career

McKean was the winner of the European Championships 800m gold medal at Split in 1990. McKean also won the 1990 European Indoor Championships final, the 1993 IAAF World Indoor Championships 800 m final, and the World Cup 800m race in 1989. In addition, he came first in all European Cup races from 1985 to 1991. However, he failed to reach the Olympic final both in 1988, when he was disqualified for too much physical contact, and 1992.

McKean, who was born in Bellshill, North Lanarkshire, was one of the favourites for the 1987 World Championships in Athletics 800 m.  However, he caught the foot of Stephen Ole Marai in the final and suffered an injury which resulted in him finishing last.  In first round qualifying for the 1991 World Championships in Athletics 800 m he slowed up too early before the line. He ended up third and failed to qualify. The two athletes ahead of him were eventual Gold and bronze medalists Billy Konchellah and Mark Everett. McKean also won a silver medal in the 1986 European Championships in Athletics 800m splitting British teammates Sebastian Coe and Steve Cram, an event memorably described by Ian Wooldridge as being "like three Spitfires coming out of the sun". He set his personal best in London in 1989 at 1:43.88 min.

McKean represented Scotland in Commonwealth Games events. He picked up two silver medals. The second of those was in 1990 when he was part of the 4 × 400 m team for Scotland with Brian Whittle a teammate.

After athletics

As of July 2006, McKean was a Strathclyde Police constable.

References
gbrathletics

External links
 Tom McKean at North Lanarkshire Sporting Hall of Fame

1963 births
Living people
Sportspeople from Bellshill
Scottish male middle-distance runners
Olympic athletes of Great Britain
Athletes (track and field) at the 1988 Summer Olympics
Athletes (track and field) at the 1992 Summer Olympics
Commonwealth Games silver medallists for Scotland
Commonwealth Games medallists in athletics
Athletes (track and field) at the 1986 Commonwealth Games
Athletes (track and field) at the 1990 Commonwealth Games
Athletes (track and field) at the 1994 Commonwealth Games
World Athletics Championships athletes for Great Britain
European Athletics Championships medalists
World Athletics Indoor Championships winners
Medallists at the 1986 Commonwealth Games
Medallists at the 1990 Commonwealth Games